"Turn Me On 'Mr. Deadman" is a song by American nu metal band The Union Underground. The song was released as the first single from the band's only studio album, ...An Education in Rebellion. The song peaked at no. 11 on the Billboard Mainstream Rock chart.

Musical style 
Metal Hammer called the song "a nu metal anthem" and stated the song "owes more to Rob Zombie and Marilyn Manson's industrial stomp than it does to Limp Bizkit's big-shorted shenanigans."

Reception 
The song was ranked at no. 36 on Metal Hammers list of "The 40 best nu metal songs of all time".

Marilyn Manson heard the song in a strip club and hand-picked The Union Underground to be his tour mates. The band would tour with Manson in fall 2000.

Track listing 
Maxi single

Enhanced single

Promo single

Personnel 
The Union Underground
Bryan Scott – vocals, guitar, co-producer
Patrick Kennison – guitar, co-producer
John Moyer – bass
Josh Memelo – drums

Additional
Don Gilmore – producer
Brendan O'Brien – mixing
George Marino – mastering

References 

2000 songs
2000 debut singles
Columbia Records singles
Nu metal songs